Belcier station is located on line  of the tramway de Bordeaux.

Location
The station is located on Eugène Delacroix road in Bordeaux.

Junctions
 Buses of the TBC:

See also
 TBC
 Tramway de Bordeaux

Bordeaux tramway stops
Railway stations in France opened in 2008
Tram stops in Bordeaux